Aq Cheshmeh (also romanized as Āq Cheshmeh) is a village in Takab Rural District, in the Central District of Dargaz County, Razavi Khorasan Province, Iran. At the 2006 census, its population was 85, in 19 families.

See also 

 List of cities, towns and villages in Razavi Khorasan Province

References 

Populated places in Dargaz County